Singanahalli is a village in Dharwad district of Karnataka, India.

Demographics 
As of the 2011 Census of India there were 130 households in Singanahalli and a total population of 656 consisting of 333 males and 323 females. There were 110 children ages 0-6.

References

Villages in Dharwad district